Pulya (Bullet) is the first album by the Russian ska-punk band Leningrad.

Track listing 
"Я так люблю тебя" - Ya tak lyublyu tebya (I Love You So Much) – 2:53
"Таблетка" - Tabletka (Pill) – 4:19
"Таня" - Tanya (Russian feminine name) – 2:29
"Лёля" - Lyolya (Russian feminine name) – 2:40
"Любовь" - Lyubov (Love, or Russian feminine name as well) – 2:31
"Пуля" - Pulya (Bullet) – 2:20
"Матросы" - Matrosy (Sailors) – 2:25
"Света" - Sveta (Russian feminine name) - 2:06
"Звёзды и Луна" - Zvyozdy i Luna (Stars and Moon) – 3:35
"Люба" - Lyuba (Russian girl's name) – 2:36
"Давай-давай" - Davay-davay (Let's Go) – 2:00
"Катюха" - Katyukha (Russian feminine name) – 2:45
"Айседора" - Aysedora (Yet another Russian feminine name) – 1:58
"Письма" - Pisma (Letters) – 2:35
"Зенит" - Zenit (FC Zenit St. Petersburg) – 3:11
"Танцы" - Tantsy (Dance) – 1:17

External links 
 Album available for download from the official Leningrad website

1999 albums
Leningrad (band) albums